Johann Kaspar Freiherr von Seiller was the first freely elected mayor of Vienna.

References 

Mayors of Vienna
1802 births
1888 deaths
Politicians from Maribor
Barons of Austria